H. C. Cohn Company Building–Andrews Building is a historic industrial and commercial building located at Rochester in Monroe County, New York. It is a five-story masonry structure built in 1889 for the H. C. Cohn Company, a manufacturer of men's neckwear and silk ties.  It housed the successor of H.C. Cohn Company, Superba Cravats, until 1983.  The Andrews Street facade is detailed with Medina sandstone and corbelled brick in Romanesque Revival style.  A two-story brick masonry addition was completed about 1955.

It was listed on the National Register of Historic Places in 1985.

See also
 National Register of Historic Places listings in Rochester, New York

References

Commercial buildings in Rochester, New York
Commercial buildings on the National Register of Historic Places in New York (state)
Industrial buildings completed in 1889
Industrial buildings and structures on the National Register of Historic Places in New York (state)
National Register of Historic Places in Rochester, New York
Industrial buildings and structures in Rochester, New York